Paul Jennings may refer to:

 Paul Jennings (Australian author) (born 1943), Australian children's author
 Paul Jennings (British author) (1918–1989), British humorist
 Paul Jennings (cyclist) (born 1970), British racing cyclist
 Paul Jennings (union worker) (1918–1987), American labor leader, president of the International Union of Electrical Workers
 Paul Jennings (voice-over artist), Melbourne mimic who performed the voices in Rubbery Figures, a political satire
 Paul Jennings (slave) (1799–1874), African-American slave of James Madison
 Paul Jennings (darts player) (born 1976), English darts player